Walled Lake is a city in Oakland County in the U.S. state of Michigan. The population was 6,999 at the 2010 census. The city is bordered by Commerce Township on the north and the city of Novi on the south.

History
The town's name is said to have been given by the first American settler, Walter Hewitt, in 1825. Upon his arrival, he noticed what appeared to be a stone wall along the western bank of a nearby lake, possibly constructed by earlier Potawatomi Indian tribes.

Walled Lake was a village inhabited by Ojibwa and Potowatamie people until about 1830. It appears that these people had relocated from an earlier village in the area that is today Southfield.

Resting spots along the Underground Railroad, where runaway slaves could sleep and eat, were called "depots". One of these was the Foster Farmhouse (built in 1833) in Walled Lake, which served as a refuge for those making their way to freedom in Canada. The Foster Farmhouse was located on Pontiac Trail near 15 mile road until 1997, when it was moved to Riley Park in downtown Walled Lake to avoid demolition.

The Walled Lake Amusement Park operated from 1929 to 1968.

In September 2022, a QAnon adherent and local resident shot multiple members of his family before being killed by police.

Geography

Walled Lake is north of the City of Novi and east of the City of Wixom.

Demographics

2010 census
As of the census of 2010, there were 6,999 people, 3,347 households, and 1,771 families living in the city. The racial makeup of the city was 88.7% White, 4.4% African American, 0.4% Native American, 2.8% Asian, 1.1% from other races, and 2.5% from two or more races. Hispanic or Latino of any race were 3.9% of the population.

There were 3,347 households, of which 25.4% had children under the age of 18 living with them, 34.4% were married couples living together, 13.7% had a female householder with no husband present, 4.8% had a male householder with no wife present, and 47.1% were non-families. 39.7% of all households were made up of individuals, and 12.8% had someone living alone who was 65 years of age or older. The average household size was 2.09 and the average family size was 2.82.

The median age in the city was 39.4 years. 19.9% of residents were under the age of 18; 8% were between the ages of 18 and 24; 30.2% were from 25 to 44; 28.2% were from 45 to 64; and 13.8% were 65 years of age or older. The gender makeup of the city was 46.6% male and 53.4% female.

2000 census
As of the census of 2000, there were 6,713 people, 3,158 households, and 1,689 families living in the city. The racial makeup of the city was 95.34% White, 0.73% African American, 0.31% Native American, 1.70% Asian, 0.49% from other races, and 1.43% from two or more races. Hispanic or Latino of any race were 1.68% of the population.

There were 3,158 households, out of which 26.2% had children under the age of 18 living with them, 39.0% were married couples living together, 11.5% had a female householder with no husband present, and 46.5% were non-families. 39.8% of all households were made up of individuals, and 12.4% had someone living alone who was 65 years of age or older. The average household size was 2.12 and the average family size was 2.88.

In the city, the population was spread out, with 21.3% under the age of 18, 7.4% from 18 to 24, 36.8% from 25 to 44, 22.5% from 45 to 64, and 12.0% who were 65 years of age or older. The median age was 37 years. For every 100 females, there were 85.7 males. For every 100 females age 18 and over, there were 81.1 males.

The median income for a household in the city was $45,386, and the median income for a family was $55,420. Males had a median income of $45,420 versus $31,021 for females. The per capita income for the city was $24,199. About 2.9% of families and 5.0% of the population were below the poverty line, including 5.9% of those under age 18 and 5.1% of those age 65 or over.

Government

Mayor
The mayor of Walled Lake is Linda Ackley.

City Council
The Council consists of seven members, including the mayor and a mayor pro tem, elected to four-year terms. Besides the mayor, current council members include: Casey Ambrose, Mindy Fernandes, Tamra Loch, John Owsinek, and Ryan Woods. Mayor Pro Tem is Bennett Lublin.

Police services
In February 2007 Walled Lake and Wolverine Lake agreed to share police services; Walled Lake took responsibility for dispatch services, and all police operations in Wolverine Lake were moved to Walled Lake. Since then Wolverine Lake has separated, having its own police station once again.

Education

The Walled Lake Consolidated Schools serves Walled Lake and has its district headquarters, the Educational Service Center, in the city. The district's Community Education Center is also in Walled Lake.

The schools within the city limits are Mary Helen Guest Elementary School and Walled Lake Elementary School. Most of the city is zoned to these schools. Portions are zoned to Meadowbrook Elementary School and Hickory Woods Elementary School.

Portions are zoned to James R. Geisler Middle School, and portions are zoned to Sarah Banks Middle School. Most of Walled Lake is zoned to Walled Lake Western High School, while a portion of Walled Lake is zoned to Walled Lake Central High School.

Roman Catholic schools are under the Roman Catholic Archdiocese of Detroit. St. William Catholic School (K–8) is in Walled Lake.

Religion
St. William Church in Walled Lake includes Walled Lake in its service area.

References

External links

City of Walled Lake
Walled Lake Schools
Walled Lake Central High School
Walled Lake Western High School
The Oakland County
Lori Marshick: Extensive history and photos

Cities in Oakland County, Michigan
Metro Detroit
Populated places established in 1954
1954 establishments in Michigan
Populated places on the Underground Railroad